SM UC-64 was a German Type UC II minelaying submarine or U-boat in the German Imperial Navy during World War I. The U-boat was ordered on 12 January 1916, laid down on 3 April 1916, and was launched on 23 January 1917. She was commissioned into the German Imperial Navy on 22 February 1917 as SM UC-64. In 15 patrols UC-64 was credited with sinking 26 ships, either by torpedo or by mines laid. UC-64 was mined and sunk in the Dover Strait on 20 June 1918.

Design
A German Type UC II submarine, UC-64 had a displacement of  when at the surface and  while submerged. The submarine was powered by two six-cylinder four-stroke diesel engines each producing  (a total of ), two electric motors producing , and two propeller shafts.

UC-64 was fitted with six  mine tubes, eighteen UC 200 mines, three  torpedo tubes (one on the stern and two on the bow), seven torpedoes, and one  Uk L/30 deck gun. Her complement was twenty-six crew members.

Summary of raiding history

References

Notes

References

Bibliography

 
 

German Type UC II submarines
U-boats commissioned in 1917
World War I submarines of Germany
Maritime incidents in 1918
U-boats sunk in 1918
U-boats sunk by mines
World War I shipwrecks in the English Channel
1917 ships
World War I minelayers of Germany
Ships built in Bremen (state)
Ships lost with all hands